Searching for You in Loving Memories is Raymond Lam's debut album and was released on 23 November 2007. It contains ten tracks with a bonus DVD track containing two music videos. It is released with three different covers for variation.

Track listing
CD
 愛在記憶中找你 (Searching For You In Loving Memories)
 朋友, 請不要傷悲 (My Friend, Please Don't Be Sad)
 赤地轉機 (Turning Point)
 你並不孤單 (You Are Not Alone)
 原罪 (Original Sin)
 真的哭了 (I Really Cried)
 潑墨桃花 (Ink On Sakura) 
 一次一次一次 (One Time, One Time, One Time)
 反話 (Opposite Words)
 自己保重 (Take Care of Yourself)

DVD 
 愛在記憶中找你 MV (Searching For You In Loving Memories MV) 
 赤地轉機 MV (Turning Point MV)

2007 debut albums
Raymond Lam albums